Pazzo d'amore (meaning "Madly in love") is a 1942 Italian comedy film directed by Giacomo Gentilomo and starring Renato Rascel.

Plot  
Two unemployed vagrants, one of small stature and the other of greater height, one day find a bottle by the sea. Inside a map, with the indication of a treasure hidden in an island. After alternating situations, they arrive on the island, but, despite themselves, they discover that the story of the treasure is an advertising invention. The little tramp overcomes the disappointment for the lack of enrichment with the love for his girlfriend.

Cast 

 Renato Rascel as Renato
 Elena Grey as  Milli
 Pietro Tordi as  Giovannone
 Tino Scotti as  Fegato
 Tina De Mola as  Elena
  Augusto Di Giovanni as  Fred
 Enzo Biliotti as  Il Guercio
 Mario Siletti as  Bombita
 Lamberto Picasso as March
 Claudio Ermelli as   Signor Pignolo
 Carlo Duse

References

External links

1942 comedy films
1942 films
Italian comedy films
Films directed by Giacomo Gentilomo
Italian black-and-white films
1940s Italian films